The 45th government of Turkey (13 December 1983 – 21 December 1987) was the first civilian government founded after the 1980 Turkish coup d'état. It is also known as the first Özal government.

Background 
Motherland Party (ANAP) won the elections held on 6 November 1983, in which only three parties were allowed to run. Turgut Özal of ANAP founded the government.

The government
In the list below, the serving period of cabinet members who served only a part of the cabinet's lifespan are shown in the column "Notes". According to Turkish constitution three members of the government were replaced by independent members before the elections.

Aftermath
The government ended with the elections held on 29 November 1987. ANAP also won the 1987 elections (albeit with reduced support), and the next government was also founded by Turgut Özal.

References

Cabinets of Turkey
Motherland Party (Turkey) politicians
1983 establishments in Turkey
1987 disestablishments in Turkey
Cabinets established in 1983
Cabinets disestablished in 1987
Members of the 45th government of Turkey
17th parliament of Turkey
Motherland Party (Turkey)